MBPJ Tower or Menara MBPJ (formerly Menara MPPJ or MPPJ Tower) is a major landmark in Petaling Jaya, Selangor, Malaysia. It houses several commercial facilities and is one of the earliest skyscrapers in the city. It is located in Petaling Jaya New Town (Section 52). The building was officially opened in October 1987 by Almarhum Sultan Salahuddin Abdul Aziz Shah of Selangor.

Structures in the Menara MBPJ
Main tower 
Plaza

Office buildings in Selangor
Skyscraper office buildings in Malaysia
Office buildings completed in 1987
Petaling Jaya
1987 establishments in Malaysia
20th-century architecture in Malaysia